Euryurus is a genus of flat-backed millipedes in the family Euryuridae. There are about 14 described species in Euryurus.

Species

References

Further reading

 
 
 
 

Polydesmida